Busbanzá is a town and municipality in the Colombian Department of Boyacá. Busbanzá is part of the Tundama Province, a subregion of Boyacá. It borders Betéitiva in the north, in the east and south Corrales and in the west Floresta.

History 
The first inhabitants of Busbanzá settled there from the Eastern Llanos near a former lake. They were the ancestors of the Muisca of Busbanzá and organized themselves in the cacicazgos of the Iraka Valley, together with Gámeza, Tobasía, Firavitoba, Iza, Pesca, Toca, Tota, Yaconí, Guaquira, Monquirá. According to the religion of the Muisca, it was bearded messenger god Bochica who educated the people to organize themselves in a theocracy. He allegedly ordered the leaders of Busbanzá, Gámeza, Pesca and Toca to choose a new ruler and priest for the Sun Temple in Sogamoso alternating between caciques of Firavitoba and Tobasía.

On September 4, 1537 the Spanish conquistadores entered the Iraka Valley and submitted the area to their new reign. Modern Busbanzá was founded on January 5, 1602.

Busbanzá is named after the cacique Boazá.

Economy 
Main economical activities of Busbanzá are agriculture (potatoes, wheat, barley, potatoes and maize) and livestock farming.

Born in Busbanzá 
 Rodolfo Torres, professional cyclist

Gallery

References 

Municipalities of Boyacá Department
Populated places established in 1602
1602 establishments in the Spanish Empire
Muisca Confederation
Muysccubun